Ribes inerme is a species of currant known by the common names whitestem gooseberry and white stemmed gooseberry. It is native to western North America from British Columbia to California and westward to the Rocky Mountains. It grows in mountain forests, woodlands, and meadows.

The less common Ribes inerme var. klamathense, known as Klamath gooseberry, is confined to the states of California and Oregon.<ref name="klamath">[http://www.calflora.org/cgi-bin/species_query.cgi?where-calrecnum=7122  Calflora taxon report, University of California: Ribes inerme var. klamathense']</ref>

DescriptionRibes inerme is an erect or spreading thicketlike shrub approaching  in maximum height. The stem is hairless or bristly and has black resin glands and spines at its nodes. The small leaves are divided deeply into three to five toothed lobes which may be divided partway into smaller lobes.

The inflorescence is a solitary flower or raceme of up to five flowers which hangs pendent. The flower has five reddish green sepals which are reflexed upward. At the center are white or pinkish petals and protruding stamens and stigmas.

The fruit is an edible hairless greenish, purple, or black berry roughly a centimeter (0.4 inch) wide.

VarietiesRibes inerme var. inerme   Ribes inerme var. klamathense'' — Klamath gooseberry

References

External links
Jepson Manual Treatment — Ribes inerme
Calflora taxon report, University of California: Ribes inerme (white stemmed gooseberry)
Ribes inerme Calphotos Photo gallery, University of California

inerme
Flora of the Western United States
Flora of Western Canada
Plants described in 1900
Flora without expected TNC conservation status